is a Japanese voice actor who voiced Vigoro in Skies of Arcadia and Jean Valjean in Les Misérables: Shōjo Cosette.

Filmography

Television animation
Aoki Densetsu Shoot! (1993) (Tetsuya Sugawara)
Trigun (1998) (Ingway)
One Piece (1999) (Porchemy)
Hajime no Ippo: New Challenger (2009) (Ricardo Martinez)
Shiki (2010) (Ozaki)
Nekogami Yaoyorozu (2011) (Narrator, Genzou)
JoJo's Bizarre Adventure (2012) (George Joestar I)
Broken Blade (2014) (Baldr)
7 Seeds (2019) (Unami)

Original video animation
Mobile Suit Gundam 0083: Stardust Memory (1991) (South Burning)
Kyō Kara Ore Wa!! (1993) (Sasaki)
Appleseed XIII (2011) (Baxter)

Theatrical animation
Doraemon: Nobita and the Animal Planet (1990) (Horse)
Doraemon: Nobita and the Spiral City (1997) (Ain Motain)
Naruto the Movie: Guardians of the Crescent Moon Kingdom (2006) (Ishidate)
Detective Conan: The Raven Chaser (2009) (Kazuki Honjo)

Video games
Shinsetsu Samurai Spirits Bushidō Retsuden (1997) (Earthquake)
Street Fighter Alpha 3 (1998) (E. Honda)
Power Stone (1999) (Valgas)
Fatal Fury: Wild Ambition (1999) (Toji Sakata)
Capcom vs. SNK (2000) (E. Honda)
Skies of Arcadia (2000) (Vigoro)
Capcom vs. SNK 2 (2001) (E. Honda)
Dissidia Final Fantasy: Opera Omnia (2017) (General Leo)
Final Fantasy VII Remake (2020) (Chocobo Sam)

Tokusatsu
Chōriki Sentai Ohranger (1995) (Bara Cactus 1 (ep. 5))
Kamen Rider Ex-Aid (2017) (Gamedeus Bugster (ep. 42 - 44))

Dubbing

Live-action
Wesley Snipes
Blade (Eric Brooks / Blade)
Blade II (Eric Brooks / Blade)
Blade: Trinity (Eric Brooks / Blade)
7 Seconds (Jack Tuliver)
The Detonator (Sonni Griffith)
Hard Luck (Lucky)
The Art of War II: Betrayal (Agent Neil Shaw)
Game of Death (Marcus Jones)
True Story (Carlton)
2 Fast 2 Furious (2006 TV Asahi edition) (Tej Parker (Ludacris))
An Alan Smithee Film: Burn Hollywood Burn (Leon Brothers (Chuck D))
Albino Alligator (Law (William Fichtner))
The Art of War III: Retribution (Agent Neil Shaw (Treach))
Bad Boys (Detective Lieutenant Mike Lowrey (Will Smith))
Bad Boys II (Detective Lieutenant Mike Lowrey (Will Smith))
Bad Boys for Life (Detective Lieutenant Mike Lowrey (Will Smith))
Blackjack (1998 TV Asahi edition) (Don Tragle (Andrew Jackson))
Cedar Rapids (Ronald Wilkes (Isiah Whitlock Jr.))
Dead Heat (1992 Fuji TV edition) (Wilcox (Chip Heller))
Event Horizon (Captain Miller (Laurence Fishburne))
Ghostbusters (1984) (1999 DVD edition) (Winston Zeddemore (Ernie Hudson))
Ghostbusters (2016) (Bill Jenkins (Ernie Hudson))
Heaven's Prisoners (Victor Romero (Hawthorne James))
Lord of War (André Baptiste Sr. (Eamonn Walker))
RoboCop (Alex Murphy / RoboCop (Peter Weller))
The Rock (1999 NTV edition) (Captain Darrow (Tony Todd))
The Secret Life of Walter Mitty (Pilot (Ólafur Darri Ólafsson))
Shanghai Noon (Lo Fong (Roger Yuan))
Sicario (Alejandro Gillick (Benicio del Toro))
Sicario: Day of the Soldado (Alejandro Gillick (Benicio del Toro))
Simon Sez (Simon (Dennis Rodman))
Timecop (Agent Max Walker (Jean-Claude Van Damme))
Universal Soldier: The Return (SETH (Michael Jai White))

Animation
Cloudy with a Chance of Meatballs (Manny)

References

External links
 
 

1962 births
Living people
Japanese male video game actors
Japanese male voice actors
Male actors from Kanagawa Prefecture
Osaka University of Arts alumni
20th-century Japanese male actors
21st-century Japanese male actors